Ben Matthews may refer to:

 Ben Matthews (musician) (born 1963), guitarist and keyboard player with Thunder
 Ben Matthews (real tennis) (born 1984), British real tennis player

See also
 Ben Mathews (born 1978), Australian rules footballer